Gabriel André Joseph Charpentier (born 17 May 1999) is a Republic of the Congo professional footballer who plays as a forward for Italian  club Parma.

Career
After being released from French top flight club Nantes, Charpentier decided to seek a move abroad because he thought "that in France, the path is a little more difficult to get there. Football is not easy". 

For the 2019 season, he signed for FK Spartaks Jūrmala in Latvia, despite being "really apprehensive at the start". Later that season, another French player joined the team, which boosted his confidence and motivation.

In 2020, Charpentier signed for Genoa in the Italian Serie A, before being loaned to Reggina 1914 in the second division.

On 1 February 2021, Charpentier moved to Serie B side Ascoli, on a loan deal until the end of the season.

On 28 July 2021 he went to Frosinone on loan. In Frosinone the French player had a great season.

On 30 August 2022, Charpentier signed with Parma.

International career
Charpentier was born in the Republic of the Congo to a French father and Congolese mother. He made himself available to play for the Congo national team in June 2022.

References

External links

 

Living people
1999 births
Association football forwards
Republic of the Congo footballers
French footballers
Republic of the Congo people of French descent
French sportspeople of Republic of the Congo descent
Latvian Higher League players
Serie B players
Serie C players
FK Spartaks Jūrmala players
U.S. Avellino 1912 players
Genoa C.F.C. players
Reggina 1914 players
Ascoli Calcio 1898 F.C. players
Frosinone Calcio players
Parma Calcio 1913 players
Republic of the Congo expatriate footballers
French expatriate footballers
French expatriate sportspeople in Latvia
Expatriate footballers in Latvia
French expatriate sportspeople in Italy
Expatriate footballers in Italy
Black French sportspeople